The Seven Altars of Dûsarra is a novel by Lawrence Watt-Evans published in 1981.

Plot summary
The Seven Altars of Dûsarra is a novel in which Garth searches for the seven altars of the city of Dusarra to destroy them.

Reception
Greg Costikyan reviewed The Seven Altars of Dusarra in Ares Magazine #12 and commented that is "readable, but nothing special".

Reviews
 Review by Andy Sawyer (1987) in "Paperback Inferno", #67

References

1981 novels